Ammanagi  is a village in the southern state of Karnataka, India. It is located in the Hukeri taluk of Belgaum district in Karnataka.

There is a Jain temple of Parshvanatha belonging to 10th or 11th century.

Demographics
 India census, Ammanagi had a population of 5488 with 2832 males and 2656 females.

See also
 Belgaum
 Districts of Karnataka

References

External links
 http://Belgaum.nic.in/

Villages in Belagavi district